Elvire de Brissac (born 19 January 1939) is a French novelist and biographer. Her awards include the Prix des Deux Magots, Grand prix des lectrices de Elle, Prix Contrepoint, Prix Goncourt, and the Prix Femina Essai.

Biography

Elvire de Brissac was born on 19 January 1939. Her father Pierre de Cossé Brissac was the 12th Duke of Brissac, a businessman and author. Her mother Marie-Zélie Schneider, also known as May Schneider, was the daughter of French industrialist Eugène Schneider II and an heiress to the Schneider-Creusot fortune.

She grew up at the Château de Brissac in Brissac-Quincé, Maine-et-Loire, France.

She is a novelist and biographer.

She received the Prix des Deux Magots for A Pleur-Joie in 1969, the Grand prix des lectrices de Elle and the Prix Contrepoint for Un long mois de septembre in 1972, the Prix Goncourt for Les anges d'en bas in 1999, and the Prix Femina Essai for Ô dix-neuvième! in 2001.

She resides at the Château d'Apremont-sur-Allier in Apremont-sur-Allier, Cher, France.

Bibliography

Novels
À pleur-joie, Grasset (1969).
Un long mois de septembre (Paris: Grasset, 1971) Grand prix des lectrices de Elle
Les Règles (Paris: Gallimard, 1974).
Ballade américaine (Paris: Stock, 1976).
Grabuge et l’Indomptable Amélie (Paris: Folio Junior, 1977).
Ma chère République (Paris: Grasset, 1983).
Le Repos (Paris: Grasset, 1986).
Au Diable (Paris: Grasset, 1993).
Le Tour de l'arbre (Paris: Grasset, 1996).
Une forêt soumise (Paris: Grasset, 1997).
Les Anges d’en bas (Paris: Grasset, 1998).
Connaissez-vous les rides ? (Paris: Grasset, 2005).
La Corde et le Vent (Paris: Grasset, 2014).

Biographies
Ô dix-neuvième ! (Paris: Grasset, 2001).
Il était une fois les Schneider, 1871-1942 (Paris: Grasset, 2007).
Voyage imaginaire autour de Barbe Nicole Ponsardin Veuve Clicquot (1777 - 1866) (Paris: Grasset, 2009).

References

1939 births
Living people
People from Cher (department)
20th-century French novelists
21st-century French novelists
French biographers
Prix Goncourt de la nouvelle recipients
Prix des Deux Magots winners
Prix Femina essai winners
21st-century French women writers
20th-century French women writers
Women biographers